Frank Franklin Hockly (1865 – 7 October 1936) was a Reform Party Member of Parliament in New Zealand.

Biography

Born in Orrell near Litherland, Lancashire, England, in 1865, Hockly emigrated to New Zealand in 1884.

Arthur Remington of the Liberal Party had held the  electorate, but he died on 17 August 1909. The resulting  was contested by five candidates, with Hockly as one of the opposition candidates leading Robert William Smith for the government by 1548 votes to 1055. At the time, the Second Ballot Act 1908 applied and since Hockly had not achieved an absolute majority, a second ballot between the two leading contenders was required. In the second contest, Smith had a majority of 400 votes over Hockly and was thus declared elected.

Smith and Hockly progressed to the second ballot, which was won by Smith with a 480 votes majority.

Hockly was elected to the Rotorua electorate in the 1919 general election, but was defeated in 1928. He was Chairman of Committees from 1926 to 1928.

In 1935, he was awarded the King George V Silver Jubilee Medal. He died in Auckland in 1936 and was buried in Waikumete Cemetery.

Notes

References

|-

1865 births
1936 deaths
People from Litherland
English emigrants to New Zealand
Reform Party (New Zealand) MPs
Members of the New Zealand House of Representatives
New Zealand MPs for North Island electorates
Burials at Waikumete Cemetery
Unsuccessful candidates in the 1911 New Zealand general election
Unsuccessful candidates in the 1928 New Zealand general election
Politicians from Liverpool